Saeid Abdevali (born 4 November 1989) is an Iranian wrestler. He is a two-time world junior champion in Greco-Roman wrestling, 2011 senior world champion and won the bronze medal at the 2016 Olympics. He was born in Andimeshk.

Abdevali won the 2011 World Championships to clinch his spot at the Olympics in London. Abdevali also won the 2010 Asian Games and won the World Cup in 2010 and 2011. This success followed his junior career, where he won the World Championship in 2008 and 2009 and was the Asian junior champion in 2008. He also won two bronze medals at the Asian junior championships before moving to the senior level in 2010. He is the cousin of Mehdi Shiri (footballer, born 1991), the Iranian football player who plays for FC Persepolis.

London 2012 Olympics
Despite being tipped to take the gold medal, Abdevali was eliminated in the London 2012 Olympics by French wrestler Steeve Guenot.

Asian Games 2014
In semi-final stage of the 2014 Asian Games, Abdevali executed 5 to appear to pin his opponent Korean Wrestler Jung Ji-hyun, and was initially announced by the referee as the winner. The Korean coach protested and the referee revised the decision. Eventually, Abdevali lost the match 6-9 to his opponent.

2016 Olympics 
At the 2016 Olympics, Abdevali competed at middleweight (75 kg).  Abdevali lost to Mark Madsen in the second round.  As Madsen reached the final, Abdevali was entered into the repechage.  There he beat Viktor Nemeš and then Péter Bácsi to win a bronze medal.

References

External links
 
 
 Profile

1989 births
Living people
Iranian male sport wrestlers
Asian Games gold medalists for Iran
Asian Games bronze medalists for Iran
People from Andimeshk
Olympic wrestlers of Iran
Wrestlers at the 2012 Summer Olympics
Wrestlers at the 2016 Summer Olympics
Asian Games medalists in wrestling
Wrestlers at the 2010 Asian Games
Wrestlers at the 2014 Asian Games
World Wrestling Championships medalists
Medalists at the 2016 Summer Olympics
Olympic bronze medalists for Iran
Olympic medalists in wrestling
World Wrestling Champions
Medalists at the 2010 Asian Games
Medalists at the 2014 Asian Games
Sportspeople from Khuzestan province
21st-century Iranian people